Michael James Peterson (September 18, 1941 – February 18, 2014) was an American Democratic member of the Kansas House of Representatives, representing the 37th district. He served from 1979 until 1990, and then again from 2005 until his death in 2014.

Career
Peterson received his law degree from the University of Missouri–Kansas City School of Law in 1971. He then practiced law.

Death
He died at the age of 72 on February 18, 2014, in a Kansas City-area hospital, following a long illness.

Committee membership
 Federal and State Affairs
 Local Government
 Elections

Major donors
The top 5 donors to Peterson's 2008 campaign:
1. Kansas Contractors Assoc 	$700 	
2. Kansas Trial Lawyers Assoc 	$500 	
3. Ruffin, Phil 	$500 	
4. Sunflower Electric Power Corp 	$500 	
5. Kansans for Lifesaving Cures 	$500

References

External links
Kansas Legislature - Michael Peterson
Project Vote Smart profile
Kansas Votes profile

1941 births
2014 deaths
University of Missouri–Kansas City alumni
Kansas lawyers
Democratic Party members of the Kansas House of Representatives
20th-century American lawyers
20th-century American politicians
21st-century American politicians